Siphonaria lessonii, is a species of air-breathing sea snail or false limpet, a marine pulmonate gastropod mollusc in the family Siphonariidae, the false limpets.

Distribution
This marine species occurs from Rocha (Uruguay) to Cape Horn and the Malvinas (Falkland) Islands in the Atlantic Ocean, through the Beagle Channel and Magellan Strait, north to Chiloé Island (Chile) in the Pacific Ocean. Published references extend the distributional range of this species to Santa Catarina, Brazil, in the Atlantic Ocean (Rios, 1994) and to Paita, Peru´ , in the Pacific (Morrison, 1963), with an additional report from Nicaragua (Dall, 1909); however, these records require confirmation.

Description
The length of the shell attains 16.5 mm.

References

External links
 Blainville, H. M. D. de. (1827). Siphonaire, Siphonaria (Malacoz.), pp. 291-296, in: Dictionnaire des Sciences Naturelles (F. Cuvier, ed.), vol. 49. Levrault, Strasbourg & Paris, & Le Normant, Paris
 Gould, A. A. (1852). Mollusca and shells. In: United States Exploring Expedition during the years 1838, 1839, 1840, 1841, 1842 under the command of Charles Wilkes. Boston. 12: 1-510; atlas 1856: 1-16
 Philippi, R. A. (1855). Observaciones sobre las conchas Magallanes. Anales de la Universidad de Chile. 1855(5): 203–213 
Güller M., Zelaya D.G. & Ituarte C. (2016). How many Siphonaria species (Gastropoda: Euthyneura) live in southern South America?. Journal of Molluscan Studies. 82(1): 80-96.
 Dayrat, B.; Goulding, T. C.; White, T. R. (2014). Diversity of Indo-West Pacific Siphonaria (Mollusca: Gastropoda: Euthyneura). Zootaxa. 3779(2): 246-276

Siphonariidae
Gastropods described in 1824